Valentina Ivanovna Telichkina (born January 10, 1945) is a Soviet and Russian film and stage actress. People's Artist of the Russian Federation (2009).

Biography 
Valentina Telichkina was born January 10, 1945 (the day of the forty-year anniversary of his mother). She was the seventh born, the youngest child of her parents.

Valentina began to show her artistic talent from early childhood - singing ditties at concerts in the kindergarten. In high school she actively participated in amateur performances: singing, dancing, reading poetry and short stories, playing guitar in a string orchestra. So after graduating from high school she went to Moscow and immediately entered VGIK, the studio Vladimir Belokurov's, where she studied from 1963 to 1967.

Since 1967, Valentina Telichkina is an actress of the National Film Actors' Theatre.

Valentina Telichkina debuted in cinema after her second year of studies at the institute, in 1965, she appeared in a small role in the film  Taiga Troopers by directors Vladimir Krasnopolsky and Valery Uskov.

In 1967, she starred in the film by Sergei Gerasimov The Journalist. Telichkina considered this role to be the most important one in life, since it was her cinematic breakthrough.

Valentina Telichkina's filmography contains more than 60 works.

In her spare time she enjoys painting. The actress loves to read, to grow flowers.

For statements against the interests of national security she was banned from entering Ukraine.

Family 
In 1980, Valentina married an architect, Vladimir Nikolaevich Gudkov. Together they have a son, Ivan Vladimirovich Gudkov (born 1979), a graduate of MGIMO.

Selected filmography
 1967 — The Journalist as Valya
 1968 — Unusual Exhibition as Glafira Ogurtsova
 1969 — Zigzag of Success as Olya
 1969 — By the Lake as Valya Korolkova
 1970 — Nachalo as Valya
 1972 — Train Stop — Two Minutes as Alyona
 1975 — It Can't Be! as Catherine, Zavitushkin's bride
 1978 — Five Evenings as Zoya, from grocery clerk
 1981 — A Painter's Wife Portrait as Nina
 1983 — Vassa  as Servant
 1983 — Crazy Day of Engineer Barkasov as Nanny
 1986 — Through Main Street with an Orchestra as Zhenya, Igor's wife
 1987 — Fun Young as Nina
 1988 — Where is the Nophelet? as female stranger on the bus
 1994 — Tinkerbell as Maria Vasilievna
 1992 — The Big Exchange as Zoya Aleksandrovna
 1996 — The Magical Portrait as Ivan's mother
 1998 — Classic as Irina
 2002 — Brigada as Belov's mother
 2005 — Yesenin as Tatiana Fyodorovna Titova, Sergei Yesenin's mother
 2009 — Gogol. Nearest as Maria Ivanovna Gogol-Yanovskaya, Nikolai Gogol's mother

References

External links

 Валентина Теличкина: обзор фильмов, фотографии. Компания «Афиша» // afisha.ru

1945 births
Living people
People from Nizhny Novgorod Oblast
Soviet film actresses
Soviet television actresses
Soviet stage actresses
Russian film actresses
Russian television actresses
Russian stage actresses
20th-century Russian actresses
21st-century Russian actresses
People's Artists of Russia
Honored Artists of the RSFSR
Recipients of the Vasilyev Brothers State Prize of the RSFSR
Recipients of the Lenin Komsomol Prize
Gerasimov Institute of Cinematography alumni
Socialist realism